The Lancaster Valley AVA is an American Viticultural Area located in Lancaster and Chester counties of southeastern Pennsylvania, centered on the city of Lancaster. The Lancaster Valley area is one of the most fertile agricultural areas in Pennsylvania, and features rich topsoil over limestone bedrock. It has a hot-summer humid continental climate (Dfa) and is located in hardiness zones 6b and 7a.

References

American Viticultural Areas
Geography of Chester County, Pennsylvania
Geography of Lancaster County, Pennsylvania
Pennsylvania wine
1984 establishments in Pennsylvania